Knacker was a Canadian indie rock band from Toronto, Ontario, Canada.

History
The band was formed in 1998 by brothers Dean Marino and Peter Marino with guitarist Jeff Nedza and drummer Gerard Ross.

The band made frequent live appearances, and opened for Sum41, Billy Talent, Limblifter, The Killjoys, Three Days Grace, and The Meligrove Band.  Much of Knacker's music can be heard in the soundtracks of  television shows, including MTV's Undergrads and The N's Radio Free Roscoe.

The band's first CD, The Self-Titled Blue EP, was released independently in 1998 and was played on Canadian campus radio.  They followed this with "Snapshot" (2000), their most well-known work.

In 2002,  Ross left the band and was replaced by drummer Chris Edelman. That year Snapshot was nominated for "Best Rock Record" at the 2nd Annual Canadian Independent Music Awards. The band continued to live in clubs and at festivals before releasing a CD, Picture Show in 2005.  The band worked on recording another album, to be titled Houses Basements and Apartments, but this was never released.

The band became inactive in 2005. Dean Marino became the co-owner of Chemical Sound Studios and a record producer/engineer, records music under the moniker EX~PO, and plays guitar for the alternative country/indie rock band Tin Star Orphans.

Members

Former
Chris Edelman  - Drums (2002–2005)
Dean Marino - Guitar/Vocals
Peter Marino - Bass guitar/Vocals
Jeff Nedza - Guitar
Gerard Ross - Drums (1998–2002)

Discography

EPs
 Self Titled Blue EP (Axis Music Group, 1998)

Albums
 Snapshot (Axis Music Group, 2000)
 Picture Show (Landed Music, 2004)

See also

Music of Canada
Canadian rock
List of Canadian musicians
List of bands from Canada
:Category:Canadian musical groups

References

External links
 "Popular local Indie Rockers celebrate sophomore album release 'Picture/Show'". top-40charts.com 01/10/2004
 2002 Canadian Independent Music Awards Nomination

Musical groups established in 1998
Musical groups disestablished in 2005
Canadian indie rock groups
Musical groups from Toronto
1998 establishments in Ontario
2005 disestablishments in Ontario